David Attenborough's Life Stories is a series of monologues written and spoken by British broadcaster David Attenborough on the subject of natural history. They were broadcast on BBC Radio 4 in 2009 as part of the station's "Point of View" strand, in the weekly timeslot formerly occupied by Alistair Cooke's Letter from America. In each of the 20 programmes, Attenborough discusses a particular subject of personal resonance, drawing on his experience of six decades filming the natural world. The series was produced by Julian Hector, head of radio at the BBC Natural History Unit.

A second 20-part series of Life Stories called New Life Stories began on 18 February 2011.

Background
The commissioning of Life Stories was announced in January 2009. Speaking of his move from television to radio, Attenborough remarked that "It's a chance to talk about fossils, archaeopteryx"  and other subjects close to his heart, including his first pet, a salamander, and his favourite animal - the bird-of-paradise. The programmes were broadcast on Friday evenings and repeated on the Sunday morning of the same week. They were also broadcast on the BBC World Service station as part of the "Letter from" strand. During the series run, each episode was made available as a podcast on the Radio 4 website, and are still available on the BBC Sounds app.

Episodes

Series 1 (2009)
{{Episode table |background=#475A2E |overall=|title= |airdate= |episodes=

{{Episode list/sublist|David Attenborough's Life Stories
 |EpisodeNumber = 1.08
 |Title = Archaeopteryx
 |OriginalAirDate = 
 |ShortSummary = Attenborough tells the story of one of the Natural History Museum's "great wonders", its Archaeopteryx fossil. Unearthed in a Bavarian limestone quarry in 1860, it later came into the possession of a local doctor and was acquired by the museum's first curator Richard Owen for £700 in 1861. This was a princely sum and recognition of Archaeopteryx'''s significance. At 150 million years old, it contains the earliest examples of feathers, which adorn the forelimbs and tail of a small dinosaur-like creature. The 1860s was a critical time in scientific history owing to Darwin's recently-published Origin of Species. However, Owen believed that God had created the archetypes for all species, and classified archaeopteryx as a bird. Most scientists, however, sided with Darwin and recognised it as an intermediate species between birds and reptiles. Further Archaeopteryx fossils have since been discovered, and in China, fossilised flightless dinosaurs with feathers on their bodies. These theropods may have developed feathers to control heat loss. Attenborough suggests that the origin of flight lies in feathered dinosaurs becoming arboreal and gliding between trees. |LineColor = 475A2E
}}

}}

Series 2 (2011)

Reception
The series drew widespread praise from the British press. Gillian Reynolds, radio critic for The Daily Telegraph, wrote "his opening talk, about his affinity with the gently ruminant three-toed sloth, was pure delight". She went on to describe Attenborough as a "gent, scholar, a brilliant communicator with a sense of humour", and added that "unlike many a radio broadcaster these days, he doesn't drop his voice on the key word in any sentence." The Observer's Kate Kellaway, comparing the "Sloth" episode to Attenborough's television work, wrote "if the marvellous first programme is anything to go by, it will prove that we do not need to be on televisual safari to be completely intrigued." Writing in The Times on Attenborough's delivery, Simon Barnes remarked that "all the time the lilting, dancing voice is alight with wonder and — let's call a spade a spade — love."

In May 2010, Attenborough won Speech Broadcaster of the Year at the Sony Radio Academy Awards for his work on Life Stories.

Book and audio book
The complete series was released in audio book form and the scripts compiled in a hardback volume. Attenborough went on a national book signing tour to promote the titles, and also appeared on the BBC One chatshow Friday Night with Jonathan Ross to talk about the book. This book contains the same text that was used in Attenborough's speeches, along with pictures at the end of each chapter, accompanied by captions written by Attenborough.
 Life Stories by David Attenborough, published in hardcover edition by BBC Books on 1 October 2009
 David Attenborough's Life Stories'', 3CD audiobook set released by BBC Audio on 21 October 2009

References

External links
 
 David Attenborough's official website
 Attenborough's biography at BBC Online

BBC Radio 4 programmes
2009 radio programme debuts
David Attenborough